Francisco Alberto Pérez (born July 20, 1997) is a Dominican professional baseball pitcher in the Washington Nationals organization. He made his MLB debut in 2021 with the Cleveland Indians, and has also played for the Washington Nationals.

Professional career

Cleveland Indians
Pérez signed with Indians as an international free agent on December 12, 2014. He spent his first season in professional baseball with the Dominican Summer League Indians. Pérez spent the 2016 season with the Arizona League Indians, logging a 2.69 ERA in 12 games. The following season, Pérez played for the Low-A Mahoning Valley Scrappers, recording a 4-4 record and 3.28 ERA in 15 starts for the team. He spent the 2018 season with the Single-A Lake County Captains, pitching to an 8-10 record and 4.07 ERA with 111 strikeouts in 26 games (25 of them starts). Pérez only appeared in 8 games in 2019 due to injury and did not play in a game in 2020 due to the cancellation of the minor league season because of the COVID-19 pandemic.

Pérez began the 2021 season with the Akron RubberDucks of the Double-A Northeast and was promoted to the Columbus Clippers of the Triple-A East on June 20, 2021. The Indians called up him up to the majors for the first time on August 9, 2021. Pérez made his major league debut on August 12, 2021, giving up three earned runs in  innings of relief. He finished out his rookie campaign with a 4.05 ERA in 4 major league games.

Washington Nationals
On November 5, 2021, the Washington Nationals claimed Pérez off waivers. He elected free agency on November 10, 2022. He re-signed a minor league deal on January 4, 2023.

References

External links

1997 births
Living people
People from Dajabón Province
Major League Baseball players from the Dominican Republic
Major League Baseball pitchers
Cleveland Indians players
Washington Nationals players
Dominican Summer League Indians players
Gulf Coast Indians players
Mahoning Valley Scrappers players
Lake County Captains players
Leones del Escogido players
Akron RubberDucks players
Columbus Clippers players